Pine River may refer to:

Places

United States
 Pine River, Michigan, an unincorporated community in Arenac County
 Pine River Township, Michigan in Gratiot County
 Pine River, Minnesota, a small city
 Pine River Township, Cass County, Minnesota
 Pine River, Wisconsin, a town
 Pine River, Lincoln County, Wisconsin, an unincorporated community
 Pine River, Waushara County, Wisconsin, a census-designated place

Canada
 Pine River, Manitoba, a small community

Rivers

Australia
 Pine River (Queensland)
 North Pine River
 South Pine River

Canada
 Pine River (British Columbia)
 Pine River Breaks Provincial Park
 Pine River (Ontario)
 Pine River, Quebec

Canada-United States
 Pine River (Minnesota–Ontario)

United States
 Pine River (Michigan), any of eight rivers in Michigan
 In Minnesota:
 Pine River (Kettle River), a river in Pine County
 Pine River (Mississippi River), a river in Crow Wing County
 Pine River (Saint Louis River), a river in St. Louis County
 Pine River (New Hampshire)
 Los Pinos River (sometimes translated as "Pine River") in Colorado and New Mexico
 Pine River (Rhode Island)
 In Wisconsin:
 Pine River (Florence County), a tributary of the Menominee River
 Pine River (Lincoln County), a tributary of the Wisconsin River in northern Wisconsin
 Pine River (Richland County), a tributary of the Wisconsin River in southwestern Wisconsin
 Pine River (Waushara County), a tributary of the Wolf River (Fox River)

Companies
 Pine River Capital Management

See also

 
 
 Rivière des Pins (disambiguation) (Pine River)
 Rivière aux Pins (disambiguation) (River of Pines)